First Baptist Church of Deerfield is a historic Baptist church on Herkimer Road in Utica, Oneida County, New York.  It is a wooden frame structure built in 1811 with vernacular Federal style details.  The structure is four bays deep and features a square entrance tower attached to the facade.

It was listed on the National Register of Historic Places in 1985.

References

Baptist churches in New York (state)
Churches on the National Register of Historic Places in New York (state)
Federal architecture in New York (state)
Churches completed in 1811
19th-century Baptist churches in the United States
Churches in Utica, New York
Churches in Oneida County, New York
National Register of Historic Places in Oneida County, New York